Gordon Mitchell (born Charles Allen Pendleton; July 29, 1923 – September 20, 2003) was an American actor and bodybuilder who made about 200 B movies.

Biography
Charles Allen Pendleton was born in Denver, Colorado, and began working out in his Denver neighbourhood to deal with his tough companions.  During World War II he served in the U.S. Army in the Battle of the Bulge where he was taken prisoner of war. He later obtained a degree at the University of Southern California under the G.I. Bill. He became a high school teacher and guidance counselor in Los Angeles, where due to his physique he was given classes containing many delinquent students.

Following a return enlistment for the Korean War, he found film extra work in movies such as Prisoner of War, The Man with the Golden Arm and Cecil B. DeMille's The Ten Commandments, where he and his friend Joe Gold dragged Charlton Heston's Moses to Pharaoh Yul Brynner. Mae West chose him to appear in her nightclub act as part of her "buffed all-male chorus line".

He was one of the American bodybuilder-actors who migrated to Italy in the wake of Steve Reeves' success in the 1958 film Hercules after he sent a photo to an Italian producer who signed him on a contract. Prior to going to Italy, he saw a clairvoyant who asked him if he had ever been known by the name of Gordon Mitchell. He replied no, but on arrival in Rome, Mitchell was given his new name. He found work first in sword and sandal films such as Sinbad, Seven Slaves Against the World,  Treasure of the Petrified Forest (1965), then in Spaghetti Westerns such as Beyond the Law and Savage Guns. Mitchell also appeared in Fellini Satyricon (1969), directed by Federico Fellini.

From the early 1970s onwards, he started to diversify into everything from horror (Frankenstein's Castle of Freaks - 1974), Nazi exploitation (Achtung! The Desert Tigers! -1977), sexploitation (Porno-Erotic Western - 1979), French criminal comedy (The Umbrella Coup - 1980), and post-apocalyptic films (Endgame - 1983). He also appeared in the bizarre 1982 Israeli adaptation of H. Rider Haggard's She as "Hector." The film was directed by Avi Nesher and co-starred Sandahl Bergman.

Mitchell was close friends with fellow American expatriate actors Richard Harrison, Mike Monty (he appeared in a number of films with both and shared an apartment with Monty in Italy during the 1960s), and John P. Dulaney. Like Monty, Harrison and Dulaney, Mitchell acted in low-budget action films in the Philippines during the 1980s, having roles in Commando Invasion and SFX Retaliator for director John Gale.

He returned to the United States in the late 1980s and retired from acting, but kept making occasional film appearances until his death in 2003 from an apparent heart attack in Marina Del Rey, California, at age 80.

Selected filmography
 Prisoner of War (1954) - Bit Role (uncredited)
 The Man with the Golden Arm (1955) - Police Officer (uncredited)
 The Ten Commandments (1956) - Egyptian Guard (uncredited)
 Around the World in 80 Days (1956) - Extra (uncredited)
 The Spirit of St. Louis (1957) - (uncredited)
 The Enemy Below (1957) - German Sailor (uncredited)
 The Young Lions (1958) - Minor Role (uncredited)
 The Buccaneer (1958) - Pirate (uncredited)
 Rio Bravo (1959) - Bar Cowboy Watching Fistfight (uncredited)
 Li'l Abner (1959) - Muscleman Rufe (uncredited)
 Spartacus (1960) - Gladiator (uncredited)
 Atlas Against the Cyclops (1961) - Maciste (as Mitchell Gordon)
 The Centurion (1961) - Gen. Metellus
 The Giant of Metropolis (1961) - Obro
 Vulcan, Son of Jupiter (1962) - Pluto
 Julius Caesar Against the Pirates (1962) - Hamar, the Pirate
 Kerim, Son of the Sheik (1962) - Yussuf
 Invasion 1700 (1962) - Ulrich
 The Fury of Achilles (1962) - Achilles
 Brennus, Enemy of Rome (1963) - Brennus
 Seven Slaves Against the World (1964) - Balisten
 The Revenge of Spartacus (1964) - Arminio
 Ali Baba and the Seven Saracens (1964) - Omar
 Erik, il vichingo (1965) - Sven / Bjarni
 Treasure of the Petrified Forest (1965) - Hunding
 La vendetta di Lady Morgan (1965) - Roger
 3 Bullets for Ringo (1966) - Frank Sanders
 Star Pilot (1966) - Murdu
 Thompson 1880 (1966) - Glenn Sheppard
 Kill or Be Killed (1966) - Baltimore Joe
 È mezzanotte... butta giù il cadavere (1966) - Van Himst
 L'estate (1966) - Himself
 Born to Kill (1967) - Roose
 Death on the Run (1967) - The Albanian
 Reflections in a Golden Eye (1967) - Stable Sergeant
 John the Bastard (1967) - Danite
 Phenomenal and the Treasure of Tutankhamen (1968) - Gregory Falco
 Sapevano solo uccidere (1968) - Clayton
 Cin cin... cianuro (1968) - Al Rubino
 Beyond the Law (1968) - Burton
 The Killer Likes Candy (1968) - Toni
 All on the Red (1968) - Erikson
 Radhapura - Endstation der Verdammten (1968) - Alfredo
 Rita of the West (1968) - Silly Bull
 Trusting Is Good... Shooting Is Better (1968) - Roy Fulton
 Cry of Death (1968) - Donkey / Morgan Pitt
 Seven Times Seven (1968) - Big Ben
 Hour X Suicide Patrol (1969) - Sgt. Orwell Smith
 Fellini Satyricon (1969) - Robber
 Sartana the Gravedigger (1969) - Deguejo
 Lisa dagli occhi blu (1969) - Football player
 The Arizona Kid (1970) - Coyote
 Django and Sartana Are Coming... It's the End (1970) - Black Burt Keller / Burt Kelly
 Dead Men Don't Make Shadows (1970) - Roger Murdock
 Io non spezzo... rompo (1971) - Joe il Rosso
 Tre nel mille (1971)
 Se t'incontro t'ammazzo (1971) - Chris Forest
 A Barrel Full of Dollars (1971) - John
 Giù le mani... carogna! (Django Story) (1971) - Buck Bradley
 Let's Go and Kill Sartana (1971) - Greg "The Crazy Person"
 Drummer of Vengeance (1971) - Deputy Norton
 Le Saut de l'ange (1971) - Henry Di Fusco
 Il suo nome era Pot (1971) - Ray Potter
 A Fistful of Death (1971) - Ironhead Donovan / Testa di Ferro
 Savage Guns (1971) - Gordon Mitchell (uncredited)
 Un uomo chiamato Dakota (1972) - Dakota
 The Big Bust Out (1972) - El Kadir
 Magnificent West (1972) - Martin
 Casa d'appuntamento (1972) - Man in Nightclub (uncredited)
 Go Away! Trinity Has Arrived in Eldorado (1972) - Jonathan Duke
 Frankenstein 80 (1972) - Dr. Otto Frankenstein
 Situation (1972) - Gordon
 Allegri becchini… arriva Trinità (1972) - Marvin
 Anything for a Friend (1973) - Miller
 Quando i califfi avevano le corna... (1973) - Caliph married to the Queen
 My Darling Slave (1973) - Von Thirac
 Once Upon a Time in the Wild, Wild West (1973) - Mike
 Pan (1973)
 Dagli archivi della polizia criminale (1973) - Peter Wilcox
 My Name Is Shanghai Joe (1973) - Burying Sam
 Frankenstein's Castle of Freaks (1974) - Igor
 Una donna per 7 bastardi (1974) - Gordon
 The Godfather Squad (1974) - Son of Carrol
 Il domestico (1974) - General Von Werner
 Dört hergele (1974) - Margherito
 Anasinin Gozu (1974)
 Yankesici (1975)
 Seven Devils on Horseback (1975) - Cooper
 La pelle sotto gli artigli (1975) - Professor Helmut
 Due Magnum .38 per una città di carogne (1975) - Renato Proietti
 Tiger from River Kwai (1975) - Jack Mason
 Le Ricain (1975) - Mike
 La polizia ordina: sparate a vista (1976) - David
 L'unica legge in cui credo (1976) - Geo (uncredited)
 Kaput Lager - Gli ultimi giorni delle SS (1977) - Kommandant von Stolzen
 Oil! (1977) - Burt
 Natascha - Todesgrüße aus Moskau (1977) - Gooming
 Gli uccisori (1977) - Pablo
 Zanna Bianca e il grande Kid (1977) - Morgan
 Pugni, dollari e spinaci (1978) - Frank Stilo
 Ishyri dosi... sex (1978)
 A Very Special Woman (1979) - Gordon
 Strategia per una missione di morte (1979) - Paul
 Dr. Jekyll Likes Them Hot (1979) - Pretorius
 Porno erotico western (1979)
 I mavri Emmanouella (1980) - Robert / Factory manager
 Holocaust parte seconda: i ricordi, i deliri, la vendetta (1980) - Felix Oppenheimer
 The Umbrella Coup (1980) - Moskovitz, le tueur
 The Iron Hand of the Mafia (1980) - Don Nicola
 Febbre a 40! (1980) - Sandy's Husband
 Trois filles dans le vent (1981) - Gordon Mitchell
 Inchon (1981) - GHQ Officer (uncredited)
 Nightfall (1981) - Maserati
 La dottoressa preferisce i marinai (1981) - The killer
 Vai avanti tu che mi vien da ridere (1981) - Il killer
 Kirmizi kelebek (1982) - Brado
 Rush (1983) - Yor
 Endgame (1983) - Col. Morgan
 Se tutto va bene siamo rovinati (1983) - Jack Volpetti
 She (1984) - Hector
 Treasure of the Lost Desert (1984) - Dealer
 Diamond Connection (1984) - Harry / Abdul Pasha
 Ricordi (1984)
 White Fire (1985) - Olaf
 Operation Nam (1986) - Col. Mortimer
 Le miniere del Kilimangiaro (1986) - Rolf
 Three Men on Fire (1986)
 Commando Invasion (1986) - General MacMoreland
 Evil Spawn (1987) - Dan Thorn
 SFX Retaliator (1987) - Morgan
 Overdose (1987) - Costa
 Cross of the Seven Jewels (1987) - Black Mass Leader
 Faida (1988) - Prete
 La tempesta (1988)
 Blood Delirium (N/A) - Hermann
 Bikini Drive-In (1995) - Goliath
 An Enraged New World (2002) - Gen. Murchison
 Malevolence (2004) - Capo Fabrizio De Martino
 Die to Live - Das Musikill (2004) - Himself (final film role)

References

External links

Interview http://www.cinema-nocturna.com/gordon_mitchell_interview_prt_1.htm
A transcription of a Gordon Mitchell guest chat at Cinema Nocturna site
A Nanarland.com interview (in French) 

1923 births
2003 deaths
20th-century American educators
20th-century American male actors
American bodybuilders
American expatriates in Italy
American male film actors
United States Army personnel of the Korean War
United States Army personnel of World War II
Male actors from Denver
Male Spaghetti Western actors
People associated with physical culture
People from Marina del Rey, California
Schoolteachers from California
University of Southern California alumni
World War II prisoners of war held by Germany